The American Cinema Editors Award for Best Edited Documentary – (Non-Theatrical) is one of the annual awards given by the American Cinema Editors. The award was first presented at the 2013 ceremony, prior to that year both film and television documentaries competed in the same category, the Best Edited Documentary – Feature award.
 From 2013 to 2018 the category was named Best Edited Documentary (Television)
 Since 2018, the category was its current name.

Winners and nominees
 † – indicates the winner of a Primetime Emmy Award.
 ‡ – indicates a nomination for a Primetime Emmy Award.

2010s
Best Edited Documentary (Television)

Best Edited Documentary (Non-Theatrical)

2020s

See also
 American Cinema Editors Award for Best Edited Documentary – Feature

References

External links
 

American Cinema Editors Awards